Toboso is an unincorporated community in Licking County, in the U.S. state of Ohio.

History
Toboso was laid out in 1852 when the railroad was extended to that point. The community most likely was named after El Toboso, in Spain.  A post office was in operation at Toboso from 1854 until 1957.

References

Unincorporated communities in Licking County, Ohio
1858 establishments in Ohio
Populated places established in 1858
Unincorporated communities in Ohio